Oghab 44 or Eagle 44 (in Persian: عقاب 44) is an Iranian underground airbase unveiled in February 2023. It is the first tactical and secret airbase for the army's air force that accommodates the fighters, bombers, and Iranian UAVs. 

Oghab 44 includes: an alert area, a command post, aircraft hangars, repair and maintenance facilities, navigation and airport equipment and fuel storage.

The underground bases are used to protect fighter jets in secure locations and outfit aircraft with electronic warfare systems and a variety of bombs and missiles, including Yasin, Qaem and Asef, enabling long-range airstrikes and expanding strategic strikes to distant targets.

Nomination 
The number of 44 refer to forty-forth anniversary of 1979 revolution in Iran. It is called by IRIAF as "Hybrid's" base for being capable to receive UAVs and crewed fighters.

References 

Underground hangars
Iranian airbases
Islamic Republic of Iran Air Force